Elizabeth Park is a city park located in Hartford and West Hartford, Connecticut.

The site was previously owned by financier Charles M. Pond of the New York, New Haven & Hartford Railroad and Hartford National Bank, and a treasurer of Connecticut (1870–71). In 1894 he bequeathed his estate to the City of Hartford with the stipulation that it be named for his deceased wife, Elizabeth. The city took possession in 1897 and engaged the famed Olmsted and Son for landscaping.

In 1904 the park's first superintendent, Theodore Wirth, created its renowned Rose Garden. It is the oldest municipal rose garden in the United States, currently containing about 15,000 bushes of 800 rose varieties. In the 1970s the city decided it could no longer afford the garden, and initially proposed plowing it under, until volunteers banded together and came to the rescue.

In 1977 volunteers banded together with Vic Jarm (Park Superintendent at the time) to form the Friends of Elizabeth Park and save the Rose Garden. Their first mission was to raise $10,000 to replace many of the rose bushes that died from lack of care. Since then the Friends of Elizabeth Park have assisted the City of Hartford in maintaining the Rose Garden as well as the other horticultural gardens in the park and have raised funds for the restoration of the historic greenhouses and the Elizabeth Pond Memorial in 1997, also known as the Pond House Cafe. Most of the financial support for the park through the efforts of the FEP comes from individuals, the Ethel Donaghue Trust and the Hartford Foundation for Public Giving.

Today the park encompasses many garden areas, pathways, century-old Lord and Burnham greenhouses, lawns, bowling greens, tennis courts, a picnic grove, and a scenic pond.  The border between Hartford and West Hartford has moved since the park was established, with the odd result that one of Hartford's largest parks is now located primarily within the Town of West Hartford.

Image gallery

See also
National Register of Historic Places listings in Hartford, Connecticut
National Register of Historic Places listings in West Hartford, Connecticut

References 

 Elizabeth Park
 Alicia Cornelio, Elizabeth Park: A Century of Beauty, Donning Publishers, 2004. .
 GardenSmart article

External links
 Hartford Hawks facilities

Geography of Hartford, Connecticut
West Hartford, Connecticut
National Register of Historic Places in Hartford County, Connecticut
Parks in Hartford County, Connecticut
Gardens in Connecticut
Tourist attractions in Hartford, Connecticut
Parks on the National Register of Historic Places in Connecticut